Seyfo Soley (born 16 February 1980) is a Gambian former professional footballer who played as a midfielder. He captained the Gambia national team.

Career
Soley was born in Lamin, the Gambia. He played for Banjul Hawks FC, K.S.C. Lokeren Oost-Vlaanderen, Al-Hilal and K.R.C. Genk, prior to signing for Preston North End in January 2007.

Soley made his debut for Preston North End in the 2007 fifth round of the FA Cup which Preston lost 3–1 to Manchester City. In June 2007 Preston that he had left the club after rejecting the club's offer of a new contract.

On 26 July 2008, Soley played as a trialist for Motherwell in the second half of their 4–0 friendly win over Bradford City.

Soley trialled with Norwich City in the 2008–09 season under Glenn Roeder but was not offered a permanent deal. Though he was out of contract for three years, the 30-year-old midfielder made plans to move to the Cyprus premier-tier side Apollon Limassol in 2010, and the deal took effect in January 2011, after Apollon Limassol exhausted their 17-foreign-player limit.

Notes

External links

 
http://allafrica.com/stories/201009240756.html

1980 births
Living people
Gambian footballers
Association football midfielders
The Gambia international footballers
Belgian Pro League players
Cypriot First Division players
Saudi Professional League players
Sportkring Sint-Niklaas players
K.R.C. Genk players
Preston North End F.C. players
Al Hilal SFC players
Doxa Katokopias FC players
Alki Larnaca FC players
Gambian expatriate footballers
Gambian expatriate sportspeople in Belgium
Expatriate footballers in Belgium
Gambian expatriate sportspeople in Cyprus
Expatriate footballers in Cyprus
Gambian expatriate sportspeople in England
Expatriate footballers in England
Gambian expatriate sportspeople in Saudi Arabia
Expatriate footballers in Saudi Arabia